Jan Wilsgaard (23 January 1930 – 6 August 2016) was the Chief Designer at Volvo Cars from 1950–1990, having studied at the Gothenburg School of Applied Arts (now HDK, Högskolan för Design och Konsthantverk, at the University of Gothenburg) before joining Volvo when co-founder Assar Gabrielsson still headed the company.

Wilsgaard was one of twenty-five designers nominated for Car Designer of the Century, and was followed at Volvo by the noted designer Peter Horbury.

Background and Career

As Chief Designer, Wilsgaard designed all Volvo's projects during his tenure, with few exceptions (e.g., the Volvo P1900 Sport and P1800 Coupe). One of Wilsgaard's first jobs was to design better rear windows for the PV Duett Van, a prophetic project, given that Wilsgaard went on to design the estate versions of the company's Amazon, 145, 760 and 850 Series — during a period which saw Volvo become closely associated with the station wagon / estate body type.

In addition to designing the Amazon, and 144, Wilsgaard also designed the highly regarded Volvo 164, as well as his successful estate adaptation, the 1800ES, of the company's P1800 Coupe.  According to Simon Lamarre, chief studio designer, "the 1800ES has become one of the icons for Volvo,"  inspiring the design of the Volvo C30.

When he designed the Volvo 140 Series, Wilsgaard employed a credo, "simple is beautiful".
 The design symbolized the car's robust, restrained quality.  Regarding the enormous success of the Volvo 240 series in worldwide, Wilsgaard is said to have remarked "It might be because the car is a little square and sluggish, just like the Swedes themselves."  Wilsgaard died on 6 August 2016.

Volvo cars styled by Jan Wilsgaard:
 P179, better known as the  'Margaret Rose'
 Volvo Philip (1950)
 PV 179 (1952)
 Volvo Amazon (P1200/120)
 Volvo P1400 (1967)(Volvo 140)
 Volvo 164
 Volvo 140
 Volvo 240
 Volvo 262C
 Volvo 740
 Volvo 760
 Volvo 780
 Volvo 850

Personal life
Wilsgaard was born in Brooklyn, New York in 1930. His father was a Norwegian sailor. During World War II, his family fled from Norway to Sweden. Wilsgaard died on 6 August 2016.

See also
Volvo Cars
Peter Horbury

References

External links
HDK Högskolan för Design och Konsthantverk (Highschool for Design and Construction)
Photos history of the design conception of the Volvo 164

1930 births
2016 deaths
Swedish automobile designers
Norwegian automobile designers
Volvo people
People from Brooklyn
Norwegian expatriates in Sweden